The DoG Street Journal (DSJ) is a student online newspaper and monthly news magazine of the College of William and Mary in Williamsburg, VA. Magazines are issued once a month and online stories appear regularly during the academic year.

The DoG Street Journal is named after Duke of Gloucester Street, which runs from the historic Wren Building through the heart of Colonial Williamsburg. George Srour and Dan FitzHenry began the publication as students in January 2003. The publication started as broadsheet newsprint, but has become a magazine distributed on campus once a month. It is also now distributed in digital form.

See also
List of publications at The College of William & Mary

External links
The DoG Street Journal
The College of William and Mary's official website
The DoG Street Journal's Official Site

2003 establishments in Virginia
College of William & Mary student life
Publications established in 2003
Student magazines published in the United States
Student newspapers published in Virginia